Bonaventura Bellemo, O.F.M. (died 1602) was a Roman Catholic prelate who served as Bishop of Andros (1587–1602).

Biography
Bonaventura Bellemo was ordained a priest in the Order of Friars Minor.
On 22 June 1587, he was appointed during the papacy of Pope Sixtus V as Bishop of Andros.
On 12 July 1587, he was consecrated bishop by Giulio Antonio Santorio, Cardinal-Priest of San Bartolomeo all'Isola, with Ladislao d'Aquino, Bishop of Venafro, and Leonard Abel, Titular Bishop of Sidon, serving as co-consecrators. He served as Bishop of Andros until his death in 1602.

References 

16th-century Roman Catholic bishops in the Republic of Venice
17th-century Roman Catholic bishops in the Republic of Venice
Bishops appointed by Pope Sixtus V
1602 deaths
Franciscan bishops